The deputy prime minister of the Independent State of Samoa is the deputy head of government of Samoa. The deputy prime minister is a member of the Legislative Assembly and cabinet, and is appointed by the O le Ao o le Malo (head of state) on the advice of the prime minister. The incumbent, Tuala Iosefo Ponifasio of the Faʻatuatua i le Atua Samoa ua Tasi (FAST) party, has served since 2021. His role was disputed from 24 May to 23 July due to the 2021 constitutional crisis, which was resolved when the Samoan Court of Appeal ruled that the FAST government was legitimate.

List of officeholders 

 Tofilau Eti Alesana (13 April 1982 – 18 September 1982)
 Tui Ātua Tupua Tamasese Efi (1985–1988)
 Tuila'epa Sa'ilele Malielegaoi (1991–1998)
 Vacant (23 November 1998 – 19 March 2001)
 Misa Telefoni Retzlaff (19 March 2001 – 20 March 2011)
 Fonotoe Pierre Lauofo (21 March 2011 – 18 March 2016)
 Fiamē Naomi Mataʻafa (19 March 2016 – 11 September 2020)
 Vacant (11 September 2020 – 24 May 2021)
 Tuala Iosefo Ponifasio (24 May 2021 – present)

See also 
 Prime Minister of Samoa
 Deputy prime minister

References

External links 
 Samoan Government Website

Politics of Samoa
Government of Samoa